Palestino Fútbol Club was a Honduran football club based in San Pedro Sula, Honduras.

History
They played in first division in the 1997–98 season and spent time in the Liga Nacional de Ascenso de Honduras.

Achievements
Segunda División
Runners-up (3): 1990–91, 1992–93, 1999–2000

League performance

All-time record vs. opponents

References

Defunct football clubs in Honduras
Diaspora sports clubs
Association football clubs established in 1970
Association football clubs disestablished in 2001
1970 establishments in Honduras